The Yukul, also written Jukul, were an indigenous Australian people of the Northern Territory.

Language
Little has been salvaged of the Yukul language, since it was never studied: no examples of their speech that would allow grammatical analysis exist, and only a few words were taken down. Though believed to be similar to Alawa and Marra, there is no evidence for such an inference. Most of the younger generation now speak a variety of kriol.

Country
Yukul lands covered an estimated . on the southern bank of the Roper River at the mouth of the Hogson River and around Leichhardt Bar (Urapunga). Their northern boundary lay around Mount Favenc.

Social organization
A brief description of their class divisions was given by R. H. Mathews in 1900.

History
A massive land seizure in the densely populated Gulf Country started in 1881, with 14 colonial landholders taking up stations that averaged some  each. Within the following 3 decades an estimated 600 indigenous people were shot down to make way for the cattle and sheep pastured on these runs. A Church Mission was established at Ngukurr in 1908 to take in the remnants of decimated tribes.

Recent times
Many Yukul now live at Ngukurr.

Alternative names
 Jokul
 Yikil, Yookil, Yookull
 Yikul
 Yookala
 Yukul

Source:

Notes

Citations

Sources

Aboriginal peoples of the Northern Territory